Belmont is an unincorporated community in Whitman County, Washington, United States.

History
Because it is not tracked by the U.S. Census, a Census population estimate is not available.  First settled in 1886, there are only about seven houses (most of which sit  empty) in Belmont, which is assigned the ZIP code 99104. The train tracks and highway 27 run through the town of Belmont. The grain elevators in Belmont were taken down around 2014. Belmont is 22 miles south of the town of Rosalia, Wash. and 5 miles south of Oakesdale, Wash. Belmont is 24 miles from the Whitman County Seat of Colfax, Wash.

References

Unincorporated communities in Whitman County, Washington
Unincorporated communities in Washington (state)
Populated places established in 1886
1886 establishments in Washington Territory